Emperor Guangzong of Song (30 September 1147 – 17 September 1200), personal name Zhao Dun, was the 12th emperor of the Song dynasty of China and the third emperor of the Southern Song dynasty.

He was the third son of his predecessor, Emperor Xiaozong. His mother was Emperor Xiaozong's first wife, Lady Guo (郭氏; 1126–1156), who was posthumously honoured as "Empress Chengmu" (成穆皇后). His reign was relatively peaceful, but his lack of filial piety eventually made officials replace him with his son Emperor Ningzong.

Early life
During his childhood, Guangzong either suffered from bipolar or severe neurosis. Despite this, Guangzong was reportedly filial to his father albeit his father kept on delaying the succession.

In 1194, was promoted from the ruler of a Zhou to Fu.

Emperor Xiaozong abdicated in favor of Emperor Guangzong in 1194 which Emperor Guangzong later described his crowning as king and then Emperor Guangzong as a "double celebration" which gave the city of Chongqing its present-day name in honour of Guangzong.

Reign 
Upon the succession of Emperor Guangzong in 1189, it was actually suggested that Empress Dowager Wu would act as his regent, because of his bad health. However, during his reign, it was the spouse of Guangzong who de facto ruled the Song Empire.

Guangzong constantly accompanied his father in tours and banquets. This changed due to the enormous influence of his wife Empress Li Fengniang became notorious in Chinese history for being ruthless and shrewd, and for ruling the state through her husband, who became known a "henpecked weakling" dominated by his wife. Eventually, Guangzong made up excuses in order to avoid his father.

According to Xu Wei, the Nanxi style of theatre began in Emperor Guangzong's reign. Guangzong listened to some treacherous officials and dismissed the popular military leader Xin Qiji. Furthermore, Guangzong gave into drinking in his middle years which deteriorated his mental state.

When the Retired Emperor Xiaozong became sick, Guangzong refused to visit him upsetting Xiaozong and furthermore, making Xiaozong's illness worse.

He was forced to give up his throne to Zhao Kuo, his only surviving son and child in 1194 by his officials and his grandmother, Grand Empress Dowager Wu under the reason that he was "too ill" to perform the mourning rites. In reality, they had forced him to abdicate because he refused to attend the funeral procession of his father, Emperor Xiaozong due to the influence of his wife Empress Li Fengniang, and that he refused to wear mourning clothes making the officials angry about his lack of filial piety. He died in 1200 near Shaoxing, Zhejiang possibly from melancholy as he was mentally ill or he became sick and died.

Family
Consorts and Issue:
 Empress Ciyi, of the Li clan (1144–1200), personal name Fengniang
 Zhao Ting, first son
 Zhao Kuo, Ningzong (1168–1224), second son
Princess Qi'an, third daughter
Noble Consort, of the Huang clan (貴妃 黃氏 d. 14 December 1191)
unborn child (d.1191)
Noble Consort , of the Zhang clan (贵妃 张氏)
Jieyu, of the Fu clan (婕妤 符氏)
 Unknown
 Princess Wen'an, first daughter
 Princess Hezheng, second daughter

Ancestry

See also
 Chinese emperors family tree (middle)
 List of emperors of the Song dynasty
 Architecture of the Song dynasty
 Culture of the Song dynasty
 Economy of the Song dynasty
 History of the Song dynasty
 Society of the Song dynasty
 Technology of the Song dynasty
 Jin–Song Wars

References

 

1147 births
1200 deaths
12th-century Chinese monarchs
Southern Song emperors
Monarchs who abdicated
People from Hangzhou